{{DISPLAYTITLE:C4H6O}}
The molecular formula C4H6O may refer to:

 Crotonaldehyde
 Cyclobutanone
 Dihydrofurans
 2,3-Dihydrofuran
 2,5-Dihydrofuran
 Divinyl ether
 Methacrolein
 Methyl vinyl ketone

Molecular formulas